Summer Nicks is an Australian television, film and commercial director, best known for writing and directing O21, Shambhala and Sedition as well as writing and producing Seedlings, Damaged and co-producing 3 Holes and a Smoking Gun. He has had a key involvement in the Pakistani film industry, where he lived for eight years.

In 2012–13, Seedlings won "Best Film", "People's Choice Award" at the New York City Film Festival and the South Asian Association for Regional Cooperation Film Festival with his leading lady, Aamina Sheikh winning the "Best Actress Award" twice. The film also won "Best Film" at the DC South Asian Film Festival and the London South Asian Film Festival.

In 2014, he wrote and directed the spy thriller 021. In 2015, his second directorial venture, Shambhala, a mystical action adventure being shot in northern India was put on hold so Jonathan Rhys Meyers could be recast. During that period he wrote and co-directed the action thriller Sedition.

Filmography

Awards

References

Living people
Australian emigrants to Pakistan
Australian film directors
Australian film producers
Australian screenwriters
1972 births